Julio Macat, A.S.C. (born June 20, 1957) is an Argentine-American cinematographer.

Early life and career

Born in Rosario, Santa Fe, Argentina, Macat started his career off as a camera operator, under the guidance of director Andrei Konchalovsky, and worked on four of his movies including Runaway Train and Tango & Cash.

Macat served as cinematographer on the 1990 Christmas comedy Home Alone and its sequels Home Alone 2: Lost in New York and Home Alone 3. Macat would frequently work on productions helmed by Tom Shadyac and Adam Shankman, such as Ace Ventura: Pet Detective, The Nutty Professor, The Wedding Planner, A Walk to Remember and Bringing Down the House.

Personal life
Macat has been married to actress Elizabeth Perkins since 2000, having met during production of Miracle on 34th Street. He has three children from a previous marriage.

Filmography

References

External links 

1957 births
American cinematographers
People from Buenos Aires
Argentine expatriates in the United States
Living people
Argentine people of Sardinian descent
American people of Italian descent